Samuel Moody was one of the two MPs for Bury St Edmunds in 1654 and 1656.

References

Moody